Sergei Zimakov (born January 15, 1978) is a Russian professional ice hockey player. He was selected by Washington Capitals in the  3rd round (58th overall) of the 1996 NHL Entry Draft.

External links

Living people
Washington Capitals draft picks
1978 births
Russian ice hockey defencemen